Academy Lake is a reservoir in Charles Mix County, South Dakota, in the United States.

Academy Lake took its name from nearby Academy, South Dakota.

See also
List of lakes in South Dakota

References

Reservoirs in South Dakota
Bodies of water of Charles Mix County, South Dakota